Logan Stenberg (born March 18, 1997) is an American football offensive guard for the Detroit Lions of the National Football League (NFL). He played college football at Kentucky.

Early life and high school
Stenberg grew up in Madison, Alabama and attended James Clemens High School. He was named first-team All-State at offensive tackle as a senior. In April 2022, Stenberg married Leah-Mabry Mims.

College career
Stenberg redshirted his true freshman season. He became as a starter as a redshirt freshman and started all of the Wildcats games from his redshirt sophomore season on. As a redshirt senior, Stenberg was named first-team All-Southeastern Conference by the Associated Press and a second-team All-American by the FWAA.

Professional career

Stenberg was selected by the Detroit Lions in the fourth round of the 2020 NFL Draft. On May 22, 2020, the Lions signed Stenberg to a four-year contract.

On October 25, 2021, Stenberg was placed on injured reserve.

References

External links 
 Kentucky Wildcats bio
 Detroit Lions bio

1997 births
Living people
Players of American football from Alabama
People from Madison, Alabama
American football offensive guards
Kentucky Wildcats football players
Detroit Lions players